Nathaniel Peffer (June 30, 1890 in New York City – April 12, 1964) was an American researcher on East Asian issues.

Educated at the University of Chicago, Peffer became an East Asian correspondent for the New York Tribune, and lived in China for 25 years. After invitations to lecture on East Asia at various American universities, he was appointed a lecturer at Columbia University in 1937, associate professor of International Relations there in 1939, and Professor in 1943. He retired from the university in 1958.

Literary works 
 The white man's dilemma - climax of the age of imperialism, 1927
 China - the collapse of a civilization, 1930
 Must we fight in Asia?, 1935
 Japan and the Pacific. 1935
 The Far East, a modern history. Ann Arbor, University of Michigan Press, 1958

References

External links
 

1890 births
1964 deaths
International relations scholars
University of Chicago alumni
American journalists
American expatriates in China
Columbia University faculty
American sinologists
American political scientists
20th-century political scientists